Morris Isaacson High School is a government secondary school in Soweto. Founded in 1956, the school took an important role at the start of the Soweto Uprising in 1976.

History

The school was named for Morris Isaacson who was a Lithuanian Jewish immigrant in 1896. He had become wealthy by trading and he set up a fund for black students to complete their education to university level. It was Isaacson who funded this school. Isaacson gave enough money to build a school with ten classrooms and it opened in 1956 with 300 pupils when it was called "Mohloding School".

During the height of apartheid, teachers at Morris Isaacson High School managed to provide good quality education, despite the oppressive limits of the  underfunded Bantu Education system. 

On 8 June 1976, the South African Police attempted to arrest Enos Ngutshane at Naledi High School. He was the local leader of the South African Students Movement. He had sent a letter to the government about the imposition of Afrikaans as the language to be used in schools. The police failed to apprehend him, and the police were stoned and a Volkswagen Beetle was set on fire by the students.

On 16 June, students had gathered at Naledi High School to walk to Morris Isaacson High School in Jabavu. Tsietsi Mashinini, a student at this school was a leader of the march of protest. The plan was to gather at Orlando Stadium, but before that the police arrived and school children were shot.

Because of the prominent role that students played in the Soweto Uprising, Morris Isaacson High School was forced to remain shut from June 1976 until 1979. When it reopened, the school managed to survive the turbulent decade of the 1980s. In 1991, a fire destroyed large portions of the school, including the administration block and damaged the library,  some classes and the laboratory. 

In 1992, the film Sarafina! was filmed at Morris Isaacson High School. The school was chosen partly because of its association with student activism. 

On 1 May 1993, Nelson Mandela visited the school to celebrate the school's role in the Soweto Uprising and nation's transformation.

By 1995 the school had 36 classrooms, 1100 students, and 34 teachers.

Alumni
Teboho MacDonald Mashinini – student leader in 1976
Kgomotso Moroka – barrister
Paul Trewhela – writer
 Kagiso Pat Mautloa – artist
 Reneilwe Letsholonyane –  footballer

Legacy
There is a statue of Teboho Mashinini by Johannes Phokela on the grounds that was unveiled on 1 May 2010 by the Mayor of Johannesburg. Morris Isaacson High School has become a center of  Youth Day commemorations of the 1976 Soweto Uprising.

References

Buildings and structures in Soweto
High schools in South Africa
Schools in Gauteng